MN 25 is a news television broadcaster in Mongolia. It is currently owned by B. Nandintushig.

It was founded in September 1996 by АE and JAAG LLC.

See also
Media of Mongolia
Communications in Mongolia

References

Television companies of Mongolia